"Tell Her About It" is a song written and performed by Billy Joel released as a single from his album An Innocent Man (1983). The song hit the number one spot on the Billboard Hot 100 chart for one week on September 24, 1983, replacing "Maniac" by Michael Sembello. The single was certified Gold by the RIAA for US sales of over 500,000 copies.

Single
A "special version" mixed by John "Jellybean" Benitez was also released as a 12-inch maxi single. The cover art varied depending on the country of release. The remixed version was longer, approximately five-and-a-half minutes. The B-side featured Joel's song "Easy Money" from the same album, and a live recording of the song "You Got Me Hummin'" written by Isaac Hayes and David Porter. 

In the lyrics of the song, the singer exhorts a young man to tell the woman he loves how he feels about her before he misses his chance.

Reception
Cash Box said that the song "harks back to [Joel's] urban rock ’n’ roll roots" and begins "with a falsetto straight out of Smokey Robinson & The Miracles and then proceeds to offer friendly advice via the sound of ’60s Motown — horns, back-up vocals, rhythms and all."

Music video
The video for the song shows Joel singing the song as if he were on The Ed Sullivan Show in 1963. The cover shot for the UK release of the song was taken from the video. An Ed Sullivan imitator (Will Jordan) introduces Joel (as "B.J. and the Affordables") after Topo Gigio, the talking mouse, finishes his skit. During the song there are different scenes of teenagers watching Joel on TV at home, crowding around appliance store windows watching him, dancing to his song. There is even a brief scene of a Soviet cosmonaut in space listening to the song, with the lyrics displayed at the bottom in the Russian language and in Cyrillic script. At the end of the song, comedian Rodney Dangerfield is there preparing to go on stage under the false impression that he is next, thanks Joel for warming up the crowd. "Patriska the Dancing Bear" is instead called to the stage, much to Dangerfield's disbelief.

Live performances
Joel performed the song fairly regularly after its release for a few years during the tours to support his albums An Innocent Man and The Bridge. The song however was dropped after the latter tour and it has not been performed live since 1987, making it one of the very few major hits across his career that he no longer plays in his concerts.

Track listing

12-inch maxi single

Side A
"Tell Her About It" - 3:35

Side B
"Easy Money" - 4:02
"Keeping the Faith" - 4:40

Charts

Certifications

See also 
 List of Hot 100 number-one singles of 1983 (U.S.)
 List of number-one adult contemporary singles of 1983 (U.S.)

References

External links 
  / ⒞1983 Sony BMG channel

1983 songs
1983 singles
Billy Joel songs
Songs written by Billy Joel
Billboard Hot 100 number-one singles
Song recordings produced by Phil Ramone
Columbia Records singles